Brian Ashton (born September 5, 1974) is a Canadian former soccer player who played notably with the Toronto Lynx, and is currently the Ontario Soccer Association Region 6 Head Coach.

Professional career    
Ashton began playing professional soccer with the London Lasers in 1992. He later played with the Toronto Lynx of the USL A-League in 1998 the second year of the franchise`s inception. He made his debut for the club on April 9, 1998 in an exhibition match against the Rochester Rhinos. During his tenure with the Lynx he was awarded the Toronto Lynx Fan Favorite award a record five times including a Public Relations award. He held the record for most club appearances for the Lynx, until he was surpassed by David Diplacido in 2006. In the 2000 USL A-League season he assisted Toronto by reaching the post season for the second time in the franchise`s history. In the playoffs Ashton scored a goal in the conference quarterfinals against the Long Island Rough Riders, which resulted in a 2-1 victory. The Lynx playoff run came to an end in the Eastern Conference Final against the Rochester Rhinos in a 2-1 loss on aggregate.

Once the 2002 A-league season came to a conclusion he was loaned to the Mississauga Olympians of the Canadian Professional Soccer League. He made his debut on September 11, 2002 in an Open Canada Cup match against the Toronto Croatia.  He helped the Olympians secure a playoff berth by finishing second in the Western Conference, but unfortunately were defeated by the North York Astros in a wild card match. On February 12, 2004, Ashton announced his retirement from professional soccer after he was offered a regional coach of youth development position with the Ontario Soccer Association.

International career 
Ashton made his national team debut on March 25, 1991 with the Canada men's national under-17 soccer team at the 1991 CONCACAF U-17 Tournament. He later featured with the Canada men's national under-20 soccer team in the 1992 CONCACAF U-20 Tournament. He also played with the Canada men's national under-23 soccer team at the 1994 Jeux de la Francophonie.

References 

1974 births
Living people
Canadian soccer coaches
Canadian Soccer League (1998–present) players
Canadian soccer players
Association football midfielders
Soccer people from Ontario
Sportspeople from Greater Sudbury
Toronto Lynx players
Toronto (Mississauga) Olympians players
A-League (1995–2004) players
London Lasers players